Dover station may refer to:

United Kingdom
Dover Priory railway station in Dover, Kent, England
Other railway stations in Dover

United States
Dover station (MBTA), a former station in Boston, Massachusetts, USA
Dover station (MBTA Millis Branch), a former station in Dover, Massachusetts, USA
Dover station (NJ Transit) in Dover, New Jersey, USA
Dover Plains station in Dover Plains, New York, USA, of the Metro-North Railroad
Dover Transportation Center in Dover, New Hampshire, USA

Singapore
Dover MRT station in Dover, Singapore